Madhukar Pai (also known as Madhu Pai) is a medical doctor, academic, advocate, writer, and university professor. Pai's work is around global health, specifically advocacy for better treatment for tuberculosis with a focus on South Africa and India. Pai is the Canada Research Chair of Epidemiology and Global Health at McGill University.

Education 
Pai completed medical training and his community medicine residency at the Christian Medical College Vellore, India. He received his Ph.D in epidemiology from University of California, Berkeley. He also did a postdoctoral fellowship at the University of California San Francisco.

Committees and editorial boards 
Pai serves on the Scientific Advisory Committee of FIND (the global alliance for diagnostics) and is on the World Health Organization's Strategic Advisory Group of Experts on In Vitro Diagnostics and the Access Advisory Committee of TB Alliance. He is the Chair of the Public-Private Mix Working Group of the Stop TB Partnership. Pai is also on the editorial boards of BMJ Global Health, PLoS Medicine, Lancet Infectious Diseases, and is an Editor-in-Chief of PLOS Global Public Health.

Advocacy 
Pai is a frequent media commentator on the COVID-19 pandemic in India, and in 2021 drew comparisons of the collective global action taken in response to the COVID19 pandemic versus the relative inaction towards tuberculosis. His 2021 paper in PLOS Medicine addressed power asymmetries in global health.

In 2020 and in 2021 he published papers and contributions about the decolonisation of global health work.

In 2021, Pai was critical of the global failure to widely vaccinate people against COVID-19, accused high-income nations of vaccine hoarding, and called for a waiver of intellectual property laws regarding COVID19 vaccines. In 2022 he described the global response to COVID-19 as an "unmitigated disaster".

Awards
 Chanchlani Global Health Research Award 2012
 Union Scientific Prize
 Haile T. Debas Prize
 David Johnston Faculty & Staff Award

Selected publications

References 

Indian epidemiologists
Global health
Canadian epidemiologists
Tuberculosis
Health equity
Year of birth missing (living people)
Living people
Decolonization
University of California, Berkeley alumni
University of California, San Francisco alumni
PLOS people
Royal Society of Canada
Fellows of the Canadian Academy of Health Sciences